Razi (also Romanized as Raẕī and Razi; also known as Rizi) is a village in Qaleh Miran Rural District, in the Central District of Ramian County, Golestan Province, Iran. At the 2006 census, its population was 196, in 52 families.

References 

Populated places in Ramian County